A combo washer dryer (also known more simply as a washer-dryer in the UK) is a combination in a single cabinet of a washing machine and a clothes dryer. It should not be confused with a "stackable" combination of a separate washing machine and a separate clothes dryer.

The main advantage of washer dryer combination units is their compactness. The small size of these machines, compared to the total space consumed by a separate washer and dryer, suits them to small homes, apartments, condominiums, and any place where space is an issue. Aside from having a small footprint, combo units also have a small height, allowing them to fit into confined places, like under a kitchen counter or in a closet.

Description 
Combination washer-dryers are popular among those living in smaller urban properties as they only need half the amount of space usually required for a separate washing machine and clothes dryer, and may not require an external air vent. Additionally, combination washer-dryers allow clothes to be washed and dried "in one go", saving time and effort from the user. Many washer dryer combo units are also designed to be portable so it can be attached to a sink instead of requiring a separate water line.
Washer-dryer combinations are a type of home appliance that handles the basic laundering duties of washing and drying clothes. These machines are often called "combo washer-dryers" or "all-in-one washer-dryers". They are the size of a standard or compact washing machine, but is able to perform both washing and drying functions. Designed to handle different types of fabric and garments such as clothes, sheets, and towels. Washer-dryer combos usually have functions such as temperature controls, customizable cycle controls, and ventless systems. While combo washer dryers are not as effective and efficient as a full-sized, fully functional, separate washer and dryer machines, the combos provide a viable option for those who can benefit from having a compact machine which is able to wash and dry clothes.

Many consumers confuse the term "washer-dryer combo" with similar washer and dryer configurations like stackable machines and laundry centers. The main design factor that distinguishes washer-dryer combos from other configurations is the fact that the it is a single machine (typically the size of a stand-alone washing machine) that can do both washing and drying tasks in a single combo machine.

Stackable machines, on the other hand, are defined by two separate machines: a washer and a dryer, stacked on top of one another. These stackable machines are often a good choice for large families that still need the full capacity and functionality of a washer and dryer without having to compromise too much regarding space. Most stackable washer and dryer configurations come in the front-loading design as opposed to the top-loading design, which makes it easier to access both the washer and dryer while they are stacked.

The "laundry center" is a compromise between the stackable and the combo configurations. Like the washer-dryer combo, the laundry center is a one-piece appliance.  Like the stackable configuration, the laundry center comprises two separate machines, the washer and the dryer. In most laundry centers, the dryer is mounted above the washer, making for a one-piece design that offers the compact footprint of a washer dryer combo with the functionality and capacity of stackable washing machines and drying machines. Some washer-dryer combos use a low power heating element with a high speed blower fan to dry clothes using high speed warm air, reducing energy consumption.

History 

Aside from the early wringer/washer machine of the mid-19th century, washing and drying machines were not combined until the fully electronic versions of the machines were better perfected in the latter half of the 20th century. Shortly after the very first completely automatic clothes washer was developed by Bendix Home Appliances in 1937, the same company also invented the first washer dryer combination unit in 1953.

Typical features

Front-loading design 
Most washer dryer combination units are of the front-loading design. This allows for easier access, better efficiency, and more effective washes than top-loading designs. Instead of just leaving the clothes to soak in the water throughout the entire wash, like a top-loading machine would do, the front-loading design rotates the drum along its longitudinal axis, so that the contents of the drum are repeatedly lifted in and out of the water throughout the wash cycle.

Condensation-based ventless drying system 
Most washer dryer combos are ventless and are designed with drying systems that work differently from the ordinary stand-alone (vented) dryer. Instead of venting moist hot air to the outside, like a conventional dryer would, the combo unit makes use of condensation similarly to condenser dryers. Hot dry(er) air enters the drum from either the front or the rear, and evaporates some of the moisture from the tumbling clothing. This warm, damp air is then drawn through a condensing chamber, and the extracted water is flushed out the drain hose to the sink or through the plumbing lines. These units are easy to install under cabinets, in closets or anywhere with electricity.

Typically in separate-condenser dryers, cool air is used to cool down the process air from the inside drum and to condense the vapor. In combined washer dryer units, however, cold water is used instead. The water flows in the opposite direction to the air, allowing the air to cool and to release its moisture, which is pumped out along with the water used to cool the air. These machines normally take longer than regular dryers, because the combo unit has a smaller drum, so there is less volume to allow air circulation and the drum itself must be dried immediately after a wash cycle. This water-fed drying system consumes water for both the washing and drying phases of operation, and may not be suitable for areas where water is scarce.

In recent years alternative methods of cooling the condenser have emerged.

Since condensing dryers discharge waste heat inside buildings, they may increase air conditioning heat loads in summer or provide useful heat in winter. Energy and water usage must be evaluated for the entire system over the entire year to ensure a valid comparison.

Automatic sensors and systems 
Washer dryer combinations are normally built with a number of sensors and systems to automate much of the washing and drying cycles. Some of the higher-end model washer dryer combos have sensors that monitor water level, suds levels, temperature levels, and garment dryness. The information gathered by these sensors are used to control the spin speed, cycle settings, draining systems, and other functions.

Capacity 
The amount a combo washer dryer unit can hold varies depending on the type of unit. Most hold a slightly smaller amount compared to full size machines. LG makes both a 2.3 and a 4.3 liter capacity all-in-one washer dryer. Like the equivalent difference between washers and dryers, the washing capacity is greater than the drying capacity on most combo units. Airflow through the drum is a necessary part of clothes drying, so the difference is greater (these units can generally dry only 1/2 to 3/4 of their maximum wash capacity).

Heat pump combo 
AEG-Electrolux debuted the first heat pump washer-dryer combo unit at IFA Berlin, September 2013 (AEG Okokombi). Commercialization of this product started in April 2014, and it is currently available in the whole of Europe. Main benefits compared to standard washer-dryers are low-temperature drying (and thus, improved fabric care); energy efficiency, since it uses 40% less electricity compared to standard A-class washer-dryers (according to EU energy label).
AEG Okokombi is currently produced at the Electrolux Porcia Plant in Italy, where it was designed and industrialized by local R&D, being the only heatpump washer-dryer on the European market, while Panasonic and Toshiba offer similar products (even if not compatible to European standards) in Asia since 2005.  Cold side of heat pump works as dehumidifier meanwhile hot side works as heater.

Disadvantages 
In the past combo washer dryer capacity was generally smaller than that of full-size washers, and it also took much longer to process a load of laundry. Currently available washer-dryers are able to wash  and dry  (nominal rating); they are fully comparable to standard washing machines and tumble dryers. Since washing 11 kg of clothes is quite uncommon for ordinary customers, one can wash&dry even large loads with satisfactory performances. Nevertheless, many users say they take out some wet laundry and dry their clothes in two batches to speed drying time. User review sites such as Epinions.com are full of owners who say drying times are long (even if comparable to standard heat pump tumble dryers), and this is one reason why most washer-dryer combos get poorer reviews than full-size washers and dryers. 

Another major drawback of old washer dryers combos was that they took significantly longer to dry a batch of clothes in comparison to stand-alone dryers. Stand-alone dryers make use of hot air or other heating elements to dry the clothes in a fraction of the time that it took the condensation-based drying system in combination units. This was a drawback that was inherent to the washer dryer combo design, since the dryer had to work longer to dry the drum and its enclosure as well as the clothes inside the drum. On an average, clothes that weigh between  would have kept the machine working for no less than 4.5 hours. Currently available washer-dryers are much faster than they used to be and can achieve great time savings, together with improved fabric care and no shrinkage, since drying takes place at low temperatures.

Washer dryer combo units not using a heat pump have also been criticized because they are not as efficient as some of the stand-alone machines. For these machines, longer drying times of washer dryer combos also make it difficult to increase efficiency, because the machine has to stay in operation for much longer than a stand-alone dryer does. On the other hand, in heat-pump washer dryers energy is recovered, and it enables energy saving of about 50%.

Considering the drawbacks of washer dryer combo units, some consumers may find these machines to be impractical. Small capacities on old versions, long drying times, poor efficiency ratings (with the exception of heat-pump machines), and pricing all are disadvantages of using these combo machines, which must be weighed against their space saving and convenient hookup advantages.

See also

References

External links 
 

20th-century inventions
Home appliances
Laundry drying equipment
Laundry washing equipment
Products introduced in 1953

de:Wäschetrockner#Waschtrockner